Paterne Boula Bi Boula (born 25 February 1983) is an Ivorian former footballer who played as a defender.

Career
Bi Boula began his career with Toumodi FC. He joined R.O.C. de Charleroi-Marchienne in Belgium in 2005. He left Charleroi in the summer of 2008 and joined R. Union Saint-Gilloise. After just one year with R. Union Saint-Gilloise, he left on 1 July 2009 the club and signed with HSV Hoek in the Netherlands. He left Hoek in the winter-break of the 2009–10 season.

References

External links

1983 births
Living people
Expatriate footballers in Belgium
Ivorian expatriates in Belgium
Ivorian footballers
Royale Union Saint-Gilloise players
R. Olympic Charleroi Châtelet Farciennes players
Toumodi FC players
HSV Hoek players
Footballers from Abidjan
Association football defenders